= Szymonski Canal =

Canal in Warmian-Masurian Voivodeship, Poland

Coordinates: 53.8994°N 21.6507°E

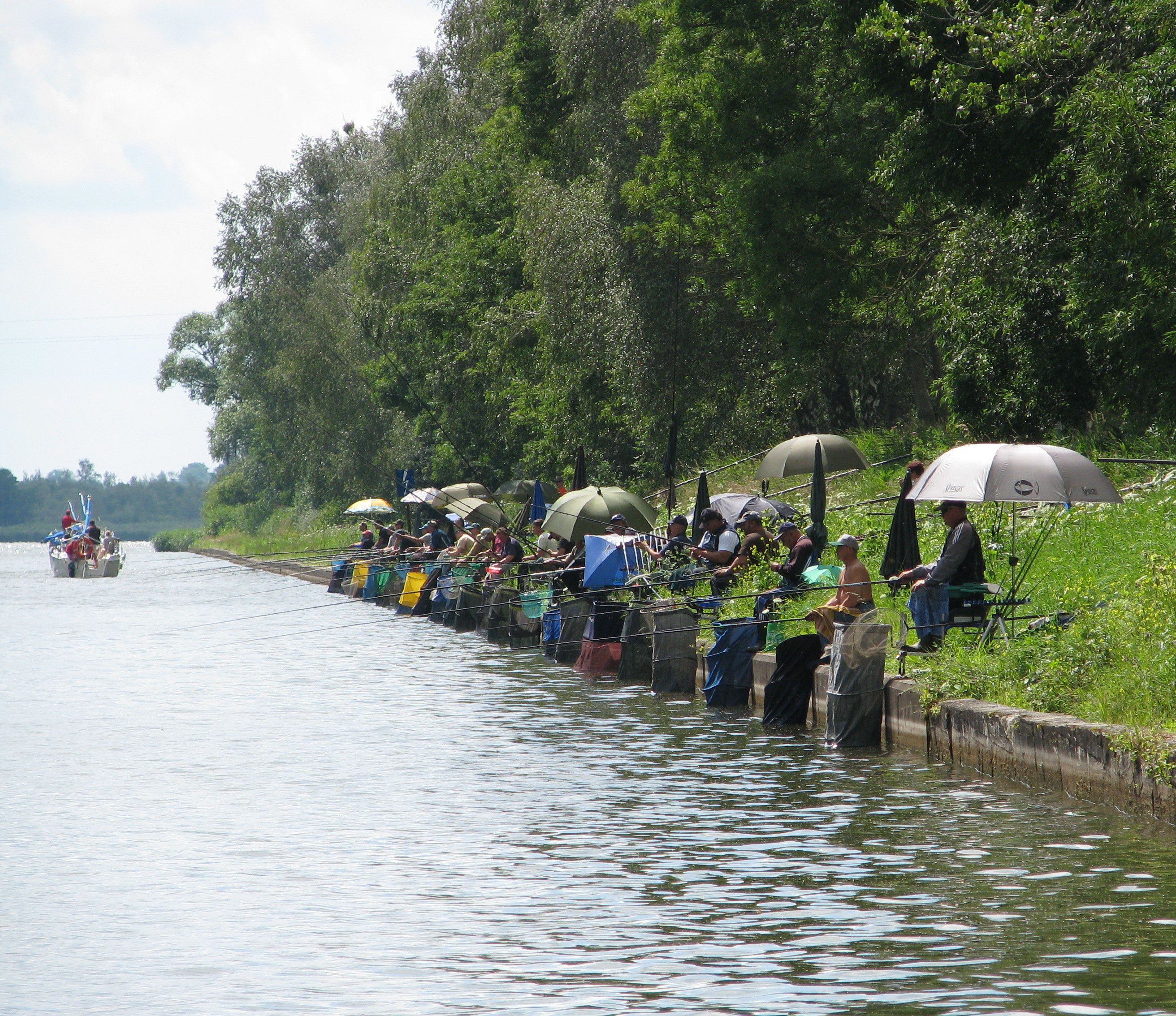
- Location: Warmian–Masurian Voivodeship
- Country: Poland

The Szymonski Canal (Polish: Kanał Szymoński) is a Masurian canal connecting the lakes Szymon and Szymonecki (the bay of lake Jagodnego).

== History of the canal ==
The canal was dug on the initiative of the Prussian authorities in the years 1765–1772, but in 1789 it ceased to function, along with the surrounding canals. It was completely destroyed during the Napoleonic Wars. The canal was rebuilt during public works carried out between 1854 and 1857.
